Kamaliyeh (also Romanized as Kamālīyeh) is a village in Hasanabad Rural District, Fashapuyeh District, Ray County, Tehran Province, Iran. At the 2006 census, its population was 52, in 10 families.

References 

Populated places in Ray County, Iran